Grand Ayatollah Qasem Taei  (Arabic:  قاسم الطائي; born 1960) is an Iraqi Twelver Shi'a Marja.

He has studied in seminaries of Najaf, Iraq under Grand Ayatollah Mohammad Mohammad Sadeq al-Sadr. He is the author of many Islamic books.

See also
List of Maraji

Notes

External links
 Publications
استفتاء للمرجع الديني الفقيه الشيخ قاسم الطائي (دام ظله)

Iraqi grand ayatollahs
Iraqi Islamists
Shia Islamists
1960 births
Living people